Orléans West-Innes Ward (Ward 2) is a city ward in the city of Ottawa, Ontario, Canada. It is located in the eastern end of the city, containing the western half of Orleans subdivision plus the community of Blackburn Hamlet. The ward is represented on Ottawa City Council by Laura Dudas.

Within Orleans, it contains the neighbourhoods of  Hiawatha Park, Convent Glen, Orleans Wood, Orléans Village, Chapel Hill and Orleans South.

History

From 1994 to 2022, the ward was known as Innes and included the community of Blackburn Hamlet as well as the neighbourhoods of Orléans Village, Châteauneuf and Chapel Hill in Orléans. It also included the part of the community of Notre-Dame-des-Champs formerly in the city of Gloucester and the newer Bradley Estates development. The ward was created when the city of Gloucester was amalgamated into the new city of Ottawa.

Following the 2020 Ottawa Ward boundary review, the ward gained the neighbourhood of Convent Glen and lost the neighbourhood of Chapel Hill South.

Demographics
According to the Canada 2011 Census

Ethnic groups: 76.8% White, 5.8% Black, 3.9% Arab, 3.5% South Asian, 2.6% Chinese, 2.1% Aboriginal, 1.3% Filipino, 1.3% West Asian 
Languages: 54.8% English, 33.0% French, 2.8% Arabic, 1.8% Chinese 
Religions: 72.9% Christian (49.3% Catholic, 5.6% Anglican, 5.1% United Church, 1.7% Christian Orthodox, 1.4% Pentecostal, 1.4% Baptist, 1.0% Presbyterian, 7.4% Other), 5.3% Muslim, 1.2% Hindu, 18.7% No religion 
Median income (2010): $45,511 
Average income (2010): $54,173

Regional and city councillors
Prior to 1994, the area was represented by the Mayor of Gloucester and 2 at large Gloucester city and regional councillors. From 1994 to 2000 the area was covered by Blackburn Hamlet and Orléans South Wards on Gloucester City Council.

 Richard Cantin (1994-2000)
 Rainer Bloess (2001-2014)
 Jody Mitic (2014–2018)
 Laura Dudas (2018–present)

Election results

1994 Ottawa-Carleton Regional Municipality elections

1997 Ottawa-Carleton Regional Municipality elections

2000 Ottawa municipal election
Following Gloucester's amalgamation into Ottawa, Gloucester City Councillor (for Blackburn Hamlet Ward) Rainer Bloess was easily elected.

2003 Ottawa municipal election

2006 Ottawa municipal election

2010 Ottawa municipal election

2014 Ottawa municipal election

2018 Ottawa municipal election

2022 Ottawa municipal election

References

External links
 Map of Innes Ward

Ottawa wards